Lucio Piccolo di Calanovella (October 27, 1901 in Palermo – May 26, 1969 in Capo d'Orlando) was an Italian poet.

Biography
Lucio Piccolo, also known as Baron Lucio Piccolo di Calanovella, was first-degree cousin to Giuseppe Tomasi di Lampedusa, the author of The Leopard. He endowed himself with a vast library and mastered the major languages of the European literary tradition, while living a life of relative solitude.

In 1954, aged 50, he published in a private edition a "plaquette" containing nine lyric poems which he mailed to Eugenio Montale. The postage costs were grossly underestimated by the sender (35 lire), and to take possession of the book, Montale had to make up the difference by paying a further(150 lire). Montale, impressed by the high quality of Lucio Piccolo's poetry, with which he was unfamiliar invited him to participate in the San Pellegrino Literary Meeting. His works were published that year as Canti barocchi e altre liriche ("Baroque Chants"). His intention, he wrote to Montale, was to capture the world and atmosphere of Palermo's churches and convents, and the case of mind of people associated with them, before the memory of them, fast fading, died completely. Giorgio Bassani, in his preface to the first edition of The Leopard wrote that Piccolo's poems ranked as the best forms of pure lyric produced in Italy at that time.

His poetry was appreciated by Yeats, Pund and Montale.

Works
Gioco a Nascondere, Canti Barocchi, introduced Eugenio Montale, Arnoldo Mondadori (1960) 1967
La Seta e altre poesie inedite e sparse, ed. Giovanni Musolino and Giovanni Gaglio, All'insegna del pesce d'oro, Milan, 1984

References

External links
Foundation Lucio Piccolo

1901 births
1969 deaths
Writers from Palermo
Italian male poets
20th-century Italian poets
Sicilian-language poets
20th-century Italian male writers